Romanistan, Romastan or Romanestan is the name of a proposed country for the Romani people.

In the early 1950s, Roma leaders petitioned the United Nations for the creation of their own state, but their petition was rejected. Creation of such a state was also reportedly suggested by the leaders of Romani party in North Macedonia known as the Party for the Complete Emancipation of Roma in the early 1990s at Šuto Orizari.

Given the origin of the Romani people in medieval India, Romanistan has been envisaged as being within the borders of India.

See also
 King of the Gypsies
 Zionism, a successful movement that advocated for the establishment of a Jewish state (Israel)

References

Romani
Proposed countries